Greene Township is the name of some places in the U.S. state of Pennsylvania:
Greene Township, Beaver County, Pennsylvania
Greene Township, Clinton County, Pennsylvania
Greene Township, Erie County, Pennsylvania
Greene Township, Franklin County, Pennsylvania
Greene Township, Greene County, Pennsylvania
Greene Township, Mercer County, Pennsylvania
Greene Township, Pike County, Pennsylvania

See also
Green Township, Pennsylvania (disambiguation)
Greenfield Township, Pennsylvania (disambiguation)
Greenville Township, Pennsylvania
Greenwich Township, Pennsylvania
Greenwood Township, Pennsylvania (disambiguation)

Pennsylvania township disambiguation pages